Liberty Township is one of nine townships in Crawford County, Indiana. As of the 2010 census, its population was 1,990 and it contained 940 housing units.

History
The William Proctor House was listed on the National Register of Historic Places in 2013.

Geography

Cities and towns
 Marengo

Adjacent townships
 Southeast Township, Orange County (north)
 Whiskey Run Township (southeast)
 Sterling Township (west)

Major highways
  Indiana State Road 64
  Indiana State Road 66

Cemeteries
The township contains four cemeteries: Marengo, Marengo New Section, Marengo Old Section and White.

References
 
 United States Census Bureau cartographic boundary files

External links

 Indiana Township Association
 United Township Association of Indiana

Townships in Crawford County, Indiana
Townships in Indiana